Constance Louise Cepko is a developmental biologist and geneticist in Harvard Medical School.

Education 
She was born in Laurel, Maryland. She received her B.S. in biochemistry and microbiology at the University of Maryland College of Computer, Mathematical, and Natural Sciences. She completed her Ph.D. at MIT in 1982.

Career and research 
As a postdoctoral research fellow she studied retroviral vectors that she used to study the development of the retina. She is the former head of the Biological and Biomedical Sciences graduate program at  Harvard Medical School.

Awards and honors 
Cepko was elected to the National Academy of Sciences in 2002. In 2011, she received the Bressler Prize in Vision Science awarded to achieved but underecognized scientists and clinicians in their field for her work in retina development. In 2019, she was selected by Brandeis University to give the Lisman Memorial Lecture in Vision Science.

References 

Year of birth missing (living people)
Living people
Harvard Medical School faculty
American geneticists
Members of the United States National Academy of Sciences
20th-century American women scientists
American neuroscientists
American women neuroscientists
20th-century American scientists
American women academics
21st-century American women